Françoise Joséphine Bella (born 9 March 1983) is a Cameroonian football midfielder who played for the Cameroon women's national football team at the 2012 Summer Olympics. On club level she played for Rivers Angels and Bayelsa Queens in Nigeria.

See also
 Cameroon at the 2012 Summer Olympics

References

External links
 
 

1983 births
Living people
Place of birth missing (living people)
Cameroonian women's footballers
Women's association football midfielders
Rivers Angels F.C. players
Cameroon women's international footballers
Olympic footballers of Cameroon
Footballers at the 2012 Summer Olympics
Cameroonian expatriate women's footballers
Cameroonian expatriate sportspeople in Nigeria
Expatriate footballers in Nigeria Women Premier League